"Gunfight" is the second single from Sick Puppies' fourth album Connect.

Charts

References

2013 songs
Song recordings produced by Rock Mafia
Songs written by Shimon Moore
2013 singles
Virgin Records singles
Sick Puppies songs
Songs written by Tim James (musician)
Songs written by Antonina Armato
Songs written by Emma Anzai